The Mahindra Maxx (or MaXX) is an offroad SUV which was launched in 2001 in nine- or ten-seat station wagon form. It replaced the earlier Armada Station Wagon. Mahindra & Mahindra took it out of production in 2010. From September 2003 on this vehicle was also available in pick-up variants known as the Maxx maxitruck or Maxx Pik Up. There was also a better equipped wagon version called the Maxx LX.

The Maxx is available in pik-up truck with two doors with a 2.5-liter inline-four cylinder diesel engine, either naturally aspirated or turbocharged. Power outputs are  while the torque is either . The regular Maxx had leaf spring suspension at both front and rear, drum brakes all around, and a four-speed manual transmission. Later versions received disc brakes up front and other improvements.

References

Mahindra vehicles
Cars introduced in 2001